Tillie the Toiler is a 1927 American silent film comedy produced by Cosmopolitan Productions and released through Metro Goldwyn Mayer studios. It is based on Russ Westover's popular comic strip Tillie the Toiler. The film was directed by Hobart Henley and stars Marion Davies.

It was remade under the same title in 1941.

Cast
Marion Davies as Tillie Jones
Matt Moore as Mac
Harry Crocker as Pennington Fish
George Fawcett as Mr. Simpkins
George K. Arthur as Mr. whipple
Estelle Clark as Sadie
Bert Roach as Bill
Gertrude Short as Bubbles
Claire McDowell as Maude Jones
Arthur Hoyt as Mr. Smythe
Ida May (uncredited)
Mary Forbes as Mrs. Fish, Pennington's Mother (uncredited)
James Murray as One of Tillie's Admirers in Restaurant (uncredited)
Russ Powell as One of Tillie's Admirers on Street (uncredited)
Turner Savage as Bill & Sadie's Chubby Boy (uncredited)

Production
In her 24th film, Marion Davies starred as the scatterbrained Tillie Jones, which was based on the famous comic strip. Davies donned a black wig for the part and remembered that she worked on this film while she was also working on The Red Mill. She recalled that for six weeks, she had to sleep on a couch in her bungalow. This was another hit film for Davies. Although filmed in Hollywood, Lucille Ball always claimed she had a bit part as an extra in this film. Ball was only 16 years old and was still on the East Coast. Yet Ball always claimed Davies as one of her role models.

Survival Status
The only known print exists at the Eastman House Museum in Rochester, New York.

References

External links

Still #1 and #2 from University of Washington, Sayer collection
Lobby poster
Stills at silenthollywood.com

1927 films
American silent feature films
Films directed by Hobart Henley
1927 comedy films
Silent American comedy films
American black-and-white films
Films based on American comics
Films based on comic strips
Live-action films based on comics
1920s American films